Minor Earth Major Box contained the four CD singles 
 "Summer Moved On"
 "Minor Earth Major Sky"
 "Velvet"
 "The Sun Never Shone That Day"

All of these singles appeared on the A-ha Album Minor Earth Major Sky

Summer Moved On
 Summer Moved On (Radio Version)
 Summer Moved On (Album Version)
 Barely Hanging On (Album Version)
 Summer Moved On (Remix)

Minor Earth Major Sky
 Minor Earth Major Sky (Niven's Radio Edit)
 Minor Earth Major Sky (Black Dog Mix)
 Minor Earth Major Sky (Millenia Nova Remix)
 Minor Earth Major Sky (Ian Pooleys Deep Mix)
 Minor Earth Major Sky (ATB Club Remix)
 Minor Earth Major Sky (Early Version)
 Minor Earth Major Sky (Album Version)
 Summer Moved On (CD Rom Video Track)

Velvet
 Velvet (Radio Version)
 Velvet (De Phazz Mix)
 Velvet (Millenia Nova Mix)
 Velvet (New York City Mix)
 Velvet (Alabaster Mix)
 Velvet (Stockholm Mix)
 Velvet (Album Version)
 Velvet (CD Rom Video Track)

The Sun Never Shone That Day
 The Sun Never Shone That Day
 Thought That It Was You
 Minor Earth Major Sky (Ian Pooleys Toothache Mix)
 Minor Earth Major Sky (Pumpin' Dolls Club Mix)
 Minor Earth Major Sky (Video)

References                 

A-ha albums
2001 compilation albums